Sait Faik Abasıyanık (18 November 1906 – 11 May 1954) was one of the greatest Turkish writers of short stories and poetry and considered an important literary figure of the 1940s. He created a brand new style in Turkish literature and brought new life to Turkish short story writing with his harsh but humanistic portrayals of labourers, fishermen, children, the unemployed, and the poor. His stories focused on the urban lifestyle and he portrayed the denizens of the darker places in Istanbul. He also explored the "...torments of the human soul and the agony of love and betrayal..."

Biography

Born in Adapazarı, on 18 November 1906, he was educated at Istanbul Lisesi in Istanbul and then in Bursa. He enrolled in the Turcology Department of Istanbul University in 1928, but under pressure from his father went to Switzerland to study economics in 1930. He left school and lived from 1931 to 1935 in France (mainly Grenoble) – an experience which had a deep impact on his art and character. After returning to Turkey he taught Turkish in Halıcıoğlu Armenian School for Orphans, and tried to follow his father's wishes and go into business but was unsuccessful. At this time he also began to publish his pieces in Varlık, a national periodical.

In 1936, he published his first book of short stories, Semaver. The majority of his work consisted of short stories; however, in 1952 he wrote a novel, Bir Takım Insanlar, which was censored due to its portrayal of the class system. A major theme of his was always the ocean and he spent most of his time in Burgazada (one of the Princes' Islands in the Marmara Sea). He became an honorary member of the International Mark Twain Society of St. Louis, Missouri on 14 May 1939. A number of researchers and critics, with a view to Sait Faik's last stories, have claimed that he tended towards surrealism. The themes of those last stories and their language and narrative deeply affected the post-1950 writers in particular through these changes. Because of the originality of his style, he has been considered as the source of himself. He died on 11 May 1954 in Istanbul.

Sait Faik mostly published under the name Sait Faik, other pen names being Adalı ("Island dweller"), Sait Faik Adalı, and S. F..

Bibliography

Legacy
Sait Faik left his wealth to the Darüşşafaka School for orphans. The Sait Faik foundation is still run by Darüşşafaka School, maintaining his Burgaz House as the Sait Faik Abasıyanık Museum and since 1954 giving the annual Sait Faik Literature Prize to the best collection of short stories. The first Sait Faik Short Story prize winner was "Gazoz Ağacı" by Sabahattin Kudret Aksal and this most prestigious literary prize has been given so far to some of the best Turkish authors including Pınar Kür, Tomris Uyar, Füruzan and Nazlı Eray.

Footnotes

References

External links

 Sait Faik Abasıyanık
Translation of "Semaver" (The Samovar) into German by H. Ozkan
Translation of a collection of Sait Faik's Short Stories by renowned translator Talat Halman

Alcohol-related deaths in Turkey
1906 births
1954 deaths
Turkish novelists
Turkish male short story writers
Deaths from cirrhosis
Istanbul High School alumni
People from Adapazarı
20th-century novelists
20th-century Turkish short story writers
20th-century male writers
Burials at Zincirlikuyu Cemetery